Kisielice  is a town in northern Poland, in the Warmian-Masurian Voivodeship, with 2,183 inhabitants (2017).

Geographical location 
In the vicinity of the town, there is a 40MW wind farm.

History
The town has been founded in the Old Prussian area formerly settled by the Pomesanians and conquered by the Teutonic Knights until the mid 13th century. First mentioned as Vrienstadt in a 1255 deed, the estates were ceded to the distinguished Stangen noble family by the Bishop of Pomesania in 1293. The bishop vested the settlement with Kulm law and the present-day townscape was laid out from about 1315 onwards. Already in 1331 it held town privileges, was well developed as a community, and had a priest. To the town's Polish population, it was known by the name of Kisielice. The town's parish church was built from stone during the first half of the 14th century. A town hall is mentioned in 1406; it has not been rebuilt after it burned down in 1860.

In 1397 Freystadt was repurchased by the Bishop of Pomesania. Upon the Second Peace of Thorn in 1466 it came under the direct rule of the State of the Teutonic Order, although under the suzerainty of Poland as a fiefdom. Soon after, in 1525, in became part of the newly established Duchy of Prussia, a vassal state of Poland, under the Hohenzollern duke Albert. The town's population was largely Polish. The town's first Protestant pastor after the Reformation was Paweł Suchodolski. The inhabitants of the town acquired their earnings to the most part from professions related to agriculture. In the town lived also a few craftsmen.

In 1773 along with territories annexed by Prussia in the First Partition of Poland the town became part of the newly established province of West Prussia. From 1818 until 1920 Freystadt belonged to Kreis Rosenberg in the administrative district of Regierungsbezirk Marienwerder in the province of West Prussia, part of Germany from 1871. In 1899 the town was connected to the railway line from Riesenburg (Prabuty) to Jablonowo.

20th century
During World War I, the Polish District People's Council (part of the Supreme People's Council) operated in the town. One of its most active members, local Polish priest Jan Mazella, was forced by the Germans to leave the town in 1920 and after the Invasion of Poland in 1939, he was murdered by the Germans in Radzim.

In 1928 about 50% of the working people were involved in trade, 20% were workmen, and 13% were civil servants, employees, pensioners and others.

After World War II the remaining German inhabitants of Freystadt/Kisielice, who had not fled prior to the end of war or who had returned, were expelled by Soviet and Polish authorities during subsequent months.

Number of inhabitants by year

Notable residents
 Karl Thom (1893-1945), World War I pilot

External links 
  Official website

Footnotes 

Cities and towns in Warmian-Masurian Voivodeship
Iława County